Moga Festival (مهرجان موڭا: Arabe:) is an electronic music festival held annually in Essaouira, Morocco, inspired by the decorations of the series Game of Thrones.

History 
The festival founded in 2016 by Matthieu Corosine, Abdeslam Alaoui and Benoit Geli, an event dedicated to contemporary music and digital arts. It has a program in the sets of the series Game of Thrones in Essaouira to connect international musicians and Moroccan artists (Gnawa Malems) with electronic music culture.Each year, the festival represents traditional Moroccan and electronic music for original projects created in this city, presented on stage during the festival.

Program 
Moga festival invites amateur artists and musical groups to perform in this event for 5 days. They contribute to the development of the youth music scene through meetings in front of the public. The festival also has activities and workshops besides music to the community.

See also 

 Gnaoua World Music Festival
 Essaouira
 Gnaoua

References 

Essaouira
Music festivals in Morocco